This is a list of members of the 12th Legislative Assembly of Queensland from 1896 to 1899, as elected at the 1896 colonial election held between 10 March 1896 and 11 April 1896 (due to problems of distance and communications, it was not possible to hold the elections on a single day).

See also
Premier:
 Hugh Nelson (Ministerial) (1893–1898)
 Thomas Joseph Byrnes (Ministerial) (1898)
 James Dickson (Ministerial) (1898–1899)

Notes
  In June 1896, John Donaldson, the Independent member for Logan, resigned after a petition was lodged against his return (although the original election was not declared void). A by-election was held on 11 July 1896, at which he was re-elected against a different opponent. However, he died two weeks later of kidney disease, and at the second by-election held on 15 August 1896, Ministerial candidate James Stodart was elected.
  At the 1896 election in Rosewood, Labour candidate Denis Keogh won by 20 votes and, following a petition by Ministerial candidate Stephen Hardgrave, the election was declared void on 11 August 1896. At the resulting by-election on 29 August, Keogh was re-elected.
  On 2 March 1898, Horace Tozer, the Ministerial member for Wide Bay, was appointed as Agent-General for Queensland, and resigned his seat. Opposition candidate Charles Moffatt Jenkinson, who counted upon Labour support, won the resulting by-election on 19 March 1898.
  On 14 April 1898, William McCord, the Ministerial member for Burnett, died. Labour candidate William Ryott Maughan won the resulting by-election on 28 May 1898.
  On 13 April 1898, the Premier and member for Murilla, Hugh Nelson, was appointed to the Queensland Legislative Council to fill the vacancy caused by the death of the President, Sir Arthur Hunter Palmer. Ministerial candidate William Moore won the resulting by-election on 28 May 1898.
  In August 1898, George Curtis, the Independent member for Rockhampton, resigned to recontest his seat at a by-election. He was returned unopposed at the close of nominations on 20 August 1898.
  On 17 September 1898, James Crombie, the Ministerial member for Warrego, died. Ministerial candidate William Hood won the resulting by-election on 22 October 1898.
  On 27 September 1898, Thomas Joseph Byrnes, the Premier and member for Warwick, died. Opposition candidate Arthur Morgan won the resulting by-election on 22 October 1898.

References

 Waterson, Duncan Bruce: Biographical Register of the Queensland Parliament 1860-1929 (second edition), Sydney 2001.
 

Members of Queensland parliaments by term
19th-century Australian politicians